Hamid Reza Azarang (born 1972 in Tehran, Iran) is an Iranian actor, director and screenwriter.

Personal life
After graduating from university, Hamid Reza Azarang began his professional career in the theater. In 1999, he was briefly featured in a film which has since been partly lost. In 2001, in addition to his work as a playwright, he became very active in the performance of various works and won related accolades. In 2007, with a serial airing abroad, at home he began work in television. His second release to cinemas was in 2009 with the movie Awakening Dreams. In 2010 he began a series on the Zayandeh Rood track, in which Yalda Hassan Mirbagheri was featured.

Azarang is married to Sanaz Bayan and has a son named Bamdad.

Filmography

Film

Television Series

Nominations
 Best Playwright in Fadjr International Theater Festival for "Death of a Salesman" 2015.
 Best Playwright in Fadjr International Theater Festival for "Memory Sealed Freshens" 2016.

References

External links

 

hamidreza azarang on elcinema website
hamidreza azarang on soundcloud website
hamidreza azarang on tvboxshow website

1972 births
Living people
Iranian male actors
Iranian male writers
People from Andimeshk
Iranian screenwriters
Iranian film directors
Iranian male film actors
Iranian theatre directors
Iranian male stage actors
Iranian male television actors